The 1971 NHL Amateur Draft was the ninth NHL Entry Draft. It was held on June 10, 1971, at the Queen Elizabeth Hotel in Montreal, Quebec.

The last active player in the NHL from this draft class was Larry Robinson, who retired after the 1991–92 season.

Selections by round
Below are listed the selections in the 1971 NHL amateur draft.

Round one

Notes
 The California Golden Seals' first-round pick went to the Montreal Canadiens as the result of a trade on May 22, 1970 that sent Ernie Hicke and Montreal's 1970 first-round pick (Chris Oddleifson) to California in exchange for Francois Lacombe, cash and this pick. 
 The Pittsburgh Penguins' first-round pick went to the St. Louis Blues as the result of a trade on June 6, 1969 that sent Craig Cameron, Ron Schock and St. Louis' second-round pick in 1972 to Pittsburgh in exchange for Lou Angotti and this pick.
 The Los Angeles Kings' first-round pick went to the Boston Bruins as the result of a trade on May 14, 1969 that sent Ross Lonsberry and Eddie Shack to Los Angeles in exchange for Los Angeles' first round pick in 1973, Ken Turlik and this pick.
 The Minnesota North Stars' first-round pick went to the Montreal Canadiens as the result of a trade on June 6, 1967 that sent Minnesota's first-round pick in 1971 to Montreal in exchange for Andre Boudrias, Bob Charlebois and Bernard Cote.
 The Toronto Maple Leafs' first-round pick went to the Philadelphia Flyers as the result of a trade on January 31, 1971 that sent Bernie Parent and Philadelphia's second-round pick in 1971 to Toronto in exchange for Bruce Gamble, Mike Walton and this pick.
 The St. Louis Blues' first-round pick went to the New York Rangers as the result of a trade on May 25, 1971 that sent Peter McDuffe to St. Louis in exchange for this pick.

Round two

 The Los Angeles Kings' second-round pick went to the Montreal Canadiens as the result of a trade on January 23, 1970 that sent Dick Duff to Los Angeles in exchange for Dennis Hextall and this pick. 
 The Philadelphia Flyers' second-round pick went to the Toronto Maple Leafs as the result of a trade on January 31, 1971 that sent Toronto's first-round pick in 1971 (Pierre Plante), Bruce Gamble and Mike Walton to Philadelphia in exchange for Bernie Parent and this pick.
 The St. Louis Blues' second-round pick went to the Montreal Canadiens as the result of a trade on January 28, 1971 that sent Fran Huck to St. Louis in exchange for this pick.

Round three

 The Vancouver Canucks' third-round pick went to the Montreal Canadiens as the result of a trade on May 25, 1971 that sent Vancouver's fourth-round pick in 1971, cash and this pick to Montreal in exchange for Gregg Boddy and Montreal's third-round pick in 1971.
 The Montreal Canadiens' third-round pick went to the Vancouver Canucks as the result of a trade on May 25, 1971 that sent Vancouver's third-round pick (Jim Cahoon) and fourth-round pick in 1971 along with cash to Montreal in exchange for Gregg Boddy and this pick.

Round four

 The Vancouver Canucks' fourth-round pick went to the Montreal Canadiens as the result of a trade on May 25, 1971 that sent Vancouver's third-round pick (Jim Cahoon), cash and this pick to Montreal in exchange for Gregg Boddy and Montreal's third-round pick in 1971 (Richard Lemieux).

Round five

Round six

Round seven

 The Buffalo Sabres' seventh-round pick went to the Los Angeles Kings as the result of a trade on November 24, 1970 that sent Dick Duff and Eddie Shack to Buffalo in exchange for Buffalo's eight-round pick in 1971, Mike McMahon Jr. and this pick.
 The Chicago Blackhawks' seventh-round pick went to the New York Rangers as the result of a trade on June 10, 1971 that sent cash to Chicago in exchange for this pick.
 The Boston Bruins' seventh-round pick went to the Toronto Maple Leafs as the result of a trade on June 10, 1971 that sent cash to Boston in exchange for this pick.

Round eight

 The Pittsburgh Penguins' eighth-round pick went to the Vancouver Canucks as the result of a trade on June 10, 1970 that sent this pick in exchange for Vancouver's promised to not take certain players in the expansion draft.
 The Buffalo Sabres' eighth-round pick went to the Los Angeles Kings as the result of a trade on November 24, 1970 that sent Dick Duff and Eddie Shack to Buffalo in exchange for Buffalo's seventh-round pick in 1971 (Pete Harasym), Mike McMahon Jr. and this pick.
 The Los Angeles Kings' eighth-round pick went to the California Golden Seals as the result of a trade on February 5, 1971 that sent Harry Howell to Los Angeles in exchange for cash and this pick.

Round nine

Round ten

Round eleven

Round twelve

Round thirteen

Round fourteen

Round fifteen

Draftees based on nationality

See also
 1971–72 NHL season
 List of NHL players

References

External links
 1971 NHL Amateur Draft player stats at The Internet Hockey Database
 HockeyDraftCentral.com

Draft
National Hockey League Entry Draft